is an artificial island in Chuo-ku, Kobe, Japan. It was constructed between 1966-1980 (Phase 1) and 1987-2009 (Phase 2) at Port of Kobe, and officially opened with an exposition called "Portopia '81." It now houses a heliport, numerous hotels, a large convention center, the UCC Coffee Museum, Japan's third IKEA store, and several parks.

The Port Liner automated guideway transit system connects Port Island to Sannomiya Station and to Kobe Airport.

Overview
Area 8.33 km2
Facilities
Universities: Kobe Women's University and Kobe Gakuin University
Hospitals: Kobe City Medical Center General Hospital and Hyogo Prefectural Kobe Children's Hospital
Hotels
Kobe Convention Center
Heliport
Institutes, including Riken Kobe Center, where the K computer supercomputer is installed
Liner berths
Container ship berths
Kobe Animal Kingdom
World Memorial Hall

See also
Rokkō Island - another artificial island in Kobe, housing port facilities and residential and commercial buildings.

References

External links

Artificial islands of Kobe
Artificial islands of Japan
Geography of Kobe
Landforms of Hyōgo Prefecture